Philip Colin Dowsett (born 4 March 1951) is a British retired motor racing driver. He initially competed in Formula Ford, Formula Three and Formula Atlantic in the 1970s, finishing as runner-up in the 1979 and 1980 National Formula Atlantic Championships. He competed regularly in the British Touring Car Championship during the 1980s in a Toyota Corolla GT. In 1988 and 1989 he won consecutive class D (up to 1600cc) titles, becoming the last driver to win that class. He finished as runner-up in the championship overall in 1988, five points behind champion Frank Sytner. He is the father of racing cyclist Alex Dowsett.

Racing record

Complete British Saloon / Touring Car Championship results
(key) (Races in bold indicate pole position) (Races in italics indicate fastest lap – 1 point awarded ?–1989 in class)

† Events with 2 races staged for the different classes.

References

External links

1951 births
Living people
English racing drivers
British Touring Car Championship drivers
British Formula Three Championship drivers
Place of birth missing (living people)
24 Hours of Spa drivers

TOM'S drivers